Avcılar is a village in the Yusufeli District, Artvin Province, Turkey. Its population is 56 (2021). This village has an agriculturally and husbandry based economy.

References

Villages in Yusufeli District